The 1961 Milwaukee Braves season was the ninth in Milwaukee and the 91st overall season of the franchise.

The fourth-place Braves finished the season with an  record, ten games behind the National League champion  The home attendance at County Stadium  fifth in the eight-team National League. It was the Braves' lowest attendance to date in Milwaukee, and was the last season surpassing one million fans.

Offseason 
 October 14, 1960: Red Schoendienst was released by the Braves.
 October 14, 1960: Stan Lopata was released by the Braves.
 December 3, 1960: Billy Martin was purchased by the Braves from the Cincinnati Reds.
 December 14, 1960: Joe Azcue was purchased by the Braves from the Cincinnati Reds.
 Prior to 1961 season (exact date unknown)
 Jim Campbell was traded by the Braves to the Houston Colt .45s for Morrie Martin.
 Clay Carroll was signed by the Braves as an amateur free agent.

Regular season 
On April 28, Warren Spahn threw a no-hitter against the San Francisco Giants.

On June 8, against the Cincinnati Reds, four consecutive Braves batters hit home runs off pitchers Jim Maloney (two) and Marshall Bridges (two more) in the seventh inning. The batters who accomplished this feat were Eddie Mathews, Hank Aaron, Joe Adcock, and Frank Thomas. Oddly, both Adcock and Thomas were former players for the Reds.

Season standings

Record vs. opponents

Notable transactions 
 April 1961: Morrie Martin was released by the Braves.
 May 9, 1961: Mel Roach was traded by the Braves to the Chicago Cubs for Frank Thomas.
 May 10, 1961: Wes Covington was selected off waivers from the Braves by the Chicago White Sox.
 June 1, 1961: Billy Martin was traded by the Braves to the Minnesota Twins for Billy Consolo.

Managerial turnover
Chuck Dressen, 66, was fired on September 2, less than a month shy of finishing his second year as the Braves'  The club was in third place at  seven games behind the league-leading Cincinnati Reds, when the change was announced after a Saturday home win over  The Braves were  under Dressen's command.

His successor was executive vice president Birdie Tebbetts, 48, a former Cincinnati manager, who came down from the Milwaukee front office to take the reins; the Braves went  under him to finish the season. Tebbetts was signed through the 1963 season but he would spend only 1962 as the Braves' skipper before leaving to become manager of the Cleveland Indians in 1963.  Tebbetts retained two of Dressen's coaches, Andy Pafko and Whit Wyatt, while George Myatt departed for the American League Detroit Tigers.

Roster

Player stats

Batting

Starters by position 
Note: Pos = Position; G = Games played; AB = At bats; H = Hits; Avg. = Batting average; HR = Home runs; RBI = Runs batted in

Other batters 
Note: G = Games played; AB = At bats; H = Hits; Avg. = Batting average; HR = Home runs; RBI = Runs batted in

Pitching

Starting pitchers 
Note: G = Games pitched; IP = Innings pitched; W = Wins; L = Losses; ERA = Earned run average; SO = Strikeouts

Other pitchers 
Note: G = Games pitched; IP = Innings pitched; W = Wins; L = Losses; ERA = Earned run average; SO = Strikeouts

Relief pitchers 
Note: G = Games pitched; W = Wins; L = Losses; SV = Saves; ERA = Earned run average; SO = Strikeouts

Awards and honors

League leaders 
 Warren Spahn, National League leader, wins

Farm system 

LEAGUE CHAMPIONS: Louisville

Notes

References 

1961 Milwaukee Braves season at Baseball Reference

Milwaukee Braves seasons
Milwaukee Braves season
1961 in sports in Wisconsin